Broadway Plaza is a skyscraper located in Rochester, Minnesota, United States. It is the tallest building in Rochester, and upon completion was the tallest residential building in a US city with a metropolitan area with a population less than 200,000. It is the 30th tallest building in Minnesota, and the tallest in the state outside of the Minneapolis-Saint Paul metropolitan area.

See also
List of tallest buildings in Rochester, Minnesota

References

Skyscrapers in Rochester, Minnesota
Residential skyscrapers in Minnesota

Buildings and structures completed in 2004